Ulzyte (Ülzyte) is a rural locality (a selo) in Yeravninsky District, Republic of Buryatia, Russia. The population was 33 as of 2010. There are 11 streets.

Geography 
Ulzyte is located 51 km southwest of Sosnovo-Ozerskoye (the district's administrative centre) by road. Mozhayka is the nearest rural locality.

References 

Rural localities in Yeravninsky District